

Kurt Feldt (22 November 1897 – 11 March 1970) was a general in the Wehrmacht of Nazi Germany during World War II. He was a recipient of the Knight's Cross of the Iron Cross. He was the German commander in the Battle of the Afsluitdijk on 12-14 May 1940.

Awards
 Knight's Cross of the Iron Cross on 23 August 1941 as Generalmajor and commander of 1. Kavallerie-Division

References

Citations

Bibliography

 

1890s births
1970 deaths
People from Starogard County
German Army generals of World War II
Generals of Cavalry (Wehrmacht)
German Army personnel of World War I
Recipients of the clasp to the Iron Cross, 1st class
Recipients of the Knight's Cross of the Iron Cross
German prisoners of war in World War II held by the United Kingdom
People from West Prussia
20th-century Freikorps personnel